The Governor Islands are located off the Kimberley coast of Western Australia.

Islands in the group include:
East Governor Island 
West Governor Island

References

Islands of the Kimberley (Western Australia)